Lepanthopsis melanantha, common name tiny orchid, is a very small epiphytic species of orchid. It is native to southern Florida and the Greater Antilles (Cuba, Hispaniola, Jamaica, Puerto Rico). In Florida, it is known only from the Fahkahatchee Swamp in Collier County.

References

External links
US Department of Agriculture Plants Profile
Institute for Regional Conservation, Floristic Inventory of South Florida Database Online, Lepanthopsis melanantha, tiny orchid
Swiss Orchid Foundation at the Herbarium Jany Renz, Lepanthopsis melanantha 

Orchids of North America
Flora of Florida
Flora of the Caribbean
Plants described in 1865
Pleurothallidinae
Flora without expected TNC conservation status